Kalauz is a rural locality (a village) in Permasskoye Rural Settlement, Nikolsky District, Vologda Oblast, Russia. The population was 11 as of 2002.

Geography 
Kalauz is located 54 km southwest of Nikolsk (the district's administrative centre) by road. Kudanga is the nearest rural locality.

References 

Rural localities in Nikolsky District, Vologda Oblast